Hobson's Choice is a 1954 British romantic comedy film directed by David Lean. It is based on the 1916 play of the same name by Harold Brighouse. It stars Charles Laughton in the role of Victorian bootmaker Henry Hobson, Brenda de Banzie as his eldest daughter and John Mills as a timid employee. The film also features Prunella Scales in one of her first cinema roles.

Hobson's Choice won the British Academy Film Award for Best British Film 1954.

Plot
Henry Horatio Hobson is the autocratic proprietor of a moderately upmarket boot shop (boots, shoes and clogs) in 1880 Salford. A widower, Hobson is a notorious miser with three grown daughters: Maggie and her younger and less-dedicated sisters, Alice and Vicky. All three have kept house and worked in their father's shop for years without wages, and Alice and Vicky are eager to marry, and their intentions infect Maggie. Alice has been seeing Albert Prosser, a young up-and-coming solicitor, while Vicky prefers Freddy Beenstock, the son of a corn merchant. Hobson has no objection to losing Alice and Vicky, but Maggie is another matter. He tells her she is too old for such things, "...thirty and shelved." While mocking her to his drinking cronies at The Moonrakers pub, he freely admits that she is too useful to lose.

Insulted, Maggie decides to marry Willie Mossop, the shop's gifted but under-appreciated bootmaker, despite the timid man having no such aspirations. When Willie informs her he has already been bullied into an engagement to his landlady's daughter, Maggie promptly puts an end to that – to his great relief. Maggie tells her father of her intentions and delivers her terms. Hobson attempts to intimidate Willie instead, by threatening to "beat the love out" of him with his belt. Willie declares he has no love for Maggie, but if Hobson strikes him, he will stick to her like glue. Hobson strikes him twice, and the couple walk out.

Maggie seeks a loan of £100 from Mrs. Hepworth, a very satisfied customer. When Mrs. Hepworth asks about security, Maggie says that Willie is the security: he is the finest bootmaker in Lancashire. With cash in hand, Maggie finds a basement that will serve as both shop and living quarters, furnishes it, has Willy buy tools and supplies, and arranges for the banns to be read.

Hobson feels Maggie's absence. Alice and Vicky are unwilling or unable to pick up the slack, in the house or the shop. The night before the wedding, Hobson storms off to The Moonrakers and gets drunk. Stumbling home, he falls through a trapdoor into the basement of Beenstock & Co., where he is found next day sleeping it off. Freddy Beenstock rushes to tell Maggie ... who gets an idea. When he awakes, Hobson is served with a notice that he is being sued for trespass and damage.

Maggie's sisters reluctantly attend Willie and Maggie's wedding at the insistence of their fiancés. The wedding dinner is held in the basement shop/home. Hobson arrives after dark to seek Maggie's advice regarding his legal woes. She manoeuvres him into negotiating with Albert Prosser, representing Freddy Beenstock. Hobson reluctantly agrees to pay £500 to settle the matter out of court. Only then does he realise he has been "diddled": the money will replace the marriage settlements Hobson refused to provide for Alice and Vicky.

Willie dreads his wedding night, but all turns out well, and he emerges a new man. The next morning, they make their first sale: a pair of bootlaces for one penny. Between Maggie's business sense and Willie's shoemaking genius, their business thrives. Within a year, they have not only paid off Mrs. Hepworth's loan and 20% interest, they have also wooed away nearly all of Hobson's upscale clientele. Under Maggie's tutelage, the meek and illiterate Willie is transforming into a confident man of business.

On New Year's Day, Hobson suffers hallucinations. Dr. MacFarlane diagnoses "chronic alcoholism." Maggie summons Willie, Vicky and Alice to  decide who will return home to look after their father. Both Vicky and Alice adamantly refuse to do so. With no alternative, Hobson tries to get Maggie and Willie back on the old terms, but Willie will not settle for anything less than a 50-50 partnership, his name first on the sign, and Hobson relegated to silent partner. Hobson grudgingly accepts.

Willie wants to change Maggie's brass wedding ring for a gold one, but she insists on keeping it – to remind them of their humble beginnings.

Cast
 Charles Laughton as Henry Horatio Hobson
 John Mills as Will Mossop
 Brenda de Banzie as Maggie Hobson
 Daphne Anderson as Alice Hobson
 Prunella Scales as Vicky Hobson
 Richard Wattis as Albert Prosser
 Derek Blomfield as Freddy Beenstock
 Helen Haye as Mrs. Hepworth
 Joseph Tomelty as Jim Heeler
 Julien Mitchell as Sam Minns, the publican
 Gibb McLaughlin as Tudsbury
 Philip Stainton as Denton
 Dorothy Gordon as Ada Figgins
 Madge Brindley as Mrs Figgins
 John Laurie as Dr. MacFarlane
 Raymond Huntley as Nathaniel Beenstock
 Jack Howarth as Tubby Wadlow, another Hobson employee
 Herbert C. Walton as Printer
 Edie Martin as Old Lady Buying Bootlaces

Production
Robert Donat was originally cast in the role of Will Mossop but had to pull out due to his asthma. The outdoor location scenes were filmed around the Salford area, with Peel Park serving as the courting place for  Maggie Hobson and William Mossop. Interiors were shot at Shepperton Studios near London with sets designed by the art director Wilfred Shingleton.

Soundtrack
Malcolm Arnold took the comical main theme for the film from his opera The Dancing Master. Throughout the film, it is linked to Hobson so often that he even whistles it at one point. Arnold wrote the score for a small pit orchestra of 22 players, and he enlisted the help of a Belgian cafe owner to play the musical saw for one pivotal scene. After a night of drinking at The Moonraker, Hobson is seeing double, and he fixates on the reflection of the moon in the puddles outside the pub. Arnold deploys the musical saw to represent the willowy allure of the moon, as the clumsy Hobson stamps from puddle to puddle, chasing its reflection.<ref>Jackson, Paul R.W. [https://books.google.com/books?id=a4tF-QPBrP4C&q=hobson%27s+choice&pg=PA45 The life and music of Sir Malcolm Arnold: the brilliant and the dark], pp. 45–46.</ref>

Reception
Box office
The film was one of the most popular at the British box office in 1954. According to Kinematograph Weekly the film was a "money maker" at the British box office in 1954.

Critical
In his New York Times review, Bosley Crowther called Hobson's Choice "a delightful and rewarding British film", and praised the performances of the three leads and its producer/director. TV Guide gave the film four stars, characterising it as "a fully developed comedy of human foibles and follies with Laughton rendering a masterful, sly performance, beautifully supported by de Banzie and Mills." In the opinion of Daniel Etherington of Channel 4, the "character interactions between the couple and the old bugger of a dad are fascinating, funny and moving." His verdict is, "Displays the Lean mark of quality and sterling work from its leads. A gem."

Awards
The film won the Golden Bear at the 4th Berlin International Film Festival in 1954 and British Film Academy Award Best British Film 1954.

Home mediaHobson's Choice is available on VHS (Warner Home Video in the UK), DVD (as part of The Criterion Collection), Blu-ray, and LaserDisc.

References

Bibliography
 The Great British Films'', pp 162–164, Jerry Vermilye, 1978, Citadel Press,

External links
 
 
 
 Hobson’s Choice: Custom-Made an essay by Armond White at the Criterion Collection

British films based on plays
1954 films
1954 comedy-drama films
British historical films
1950s historical films
British Lion Films films
London Films films
British comedy-drama films
Films set in Manchester
Films set in the 1880s
Golden Bear winners
Films directed by David Lean
British black-and-white films
Best British Film BAFTA Award winners
Films scored by Malcolm Arnold
Films shot in Greater Manchester
Films shot at Shepperton Studios
1950s English-language films
1950s British films